Leonard Johnson was a professional baseball pitcher in the Negro leagues. He played with the Chicago American Giants in 1947 and the Kansas City Monarchs in 1948. He also played in the Mexican League from 1949 to 1951, and in the Mandak League in 1951.

References

External links
 and Seamheads

Chicago American Giants players
Kansas City Monarchs players
Minot Mallards players
Year of birth missing
Year of death missing
Baseball pitchers